Moore Park is a small suburb in the Eastern Suburbs of Sydney located  from the CBD, in the state of New South Wales, Australia. It is part of local government area of the City of Sydney.

Moore Park is also a large area of parkland that is part of Centennial Parklands, a collective of three parks being Moore Park, Centennial Park and Queen's Park. Centennial Parklands is administered by the Centennial Park & Moore Park Trust, a NSW government agency. The only exception is the land on which the Sydney Cricket Ground and Sydney Football Stadium are sited; these stadiums are managed by the Sydney Cricket Ground Trust.

History

Originally known as the Sydney Common it covered some 153 hectares to the South East of the town and was designated as one of Australia's earliest parks in 1866, the following year it was named after Charles Moore, the Mayor of Sydney City Council. In 1867 several of the sandhills were levelled  and three years later inearly half of the park was covered with grass. The straight lines of Randwick Road, which passes through the park, was fenced in and replaced the old curved road. In 1837 a new water supply was built to replace the polluted 'Tank Stream' which had to that time been the colonists main supply of water. The new line connected the Busby Bore with a water from the Lachlan Swamp in what is now known as Moore Park.  

Moore Park, was also the site of Sydney's first Zoo. The Moore Park Zoological Gardens opened in 1884, and was run by less than a dozen people. Built in the area known as  Billygoat Swamp, it was subject to flooding and creating problems for both keepers and the animals. As Sydney grew so did the demand for a larger zoo. It was eventually closed down and the animals were moved to the Taronga Zoo, when it opened in 1916. The Sydney Girls' High School and later Sydney Boys High also occupied this site. 

The Moore Park Toll House appears to have been built in 1849 and still exits on the corner of Anzac Parade and Cleveland Street. It is the only two story toll house in New South Wales.

Heritage listings 
Moore Park has a number of heritage-listed sites, including:
 Driver Avenue: Sydney Cricket Ground Members' Stand and Lady Members' Stand

Commercial area

Moore Park is the former location of the Royal Agricultural Society's Sydney Showground, which hosted the annual Sydney Royal Easter Show until 1998. It moved to Homebush Bay (the site of the 2000 Olympics). The old showgrounds have since been redeveloped as Fox Studios, now Disney Studios Australia, a commercial venture designed at supporting Australia's film industry. The Entertainment Quarter is a retail, dining and entertainment precinct beside the studios. It contains cinemas, live venues, restaurants, cafes, pubs, and retailers of fashion and homewares. The Farmer's Market operates every Wednesday and Saturday in the old showground showing.

The south-western corner of the suburb boasts the Supa Centre Moore Park on South Dowling Street. It specialises in showrooms for home furnishings and home renovations. This was the site of the former Dowling Street depot for trams.

Transport
The Eastern Distributor and Anzac Parade are major arterial roads on the western border of the suburb. Transdev John Holland operate frequent bus services to Moore Park from the Sydney CBD. Special services for sporting events from Central railway station have been replaced by services on the CBD and South East Light Rail from December 2019.

On 13 December 2012, the NSW Government announced a commitment to build a $1.6 billion light rail from Circular Quay down George Street to Central station, then across to Moore Park and down Anzac Parade. South of Moore Park the line splits into two branches – one continuing down Anzac Parade to the nine ways at Kensington, and the other heading to Randwick via Alison Road. Construction commenced in 2015 and services commenced on the Randwick branch to Moore Park in December 2019.

Sports stadiums and facilities

Moore Park is the location of two of Sydney's largest sporting venues, the Sydney Cricket Ground (SCG) and Sydney Football Stadium (SFS). The Sydney Roosters Rugby league team in the National Rugby League, The Sydney Swans in the Australian Football League, Sydney FC A-League football team, NSW Waratahs rugby union team have their administration offices at Moore Park and Sydney Football Stadium is their home ground. The Moore Park Magpies are a local junior rugby league team.

The Hordern Pavilion is a multipurpose entertainment venue, while next door the Royal Hall of Industries (fondly remembered as the old Showbag Pavilion during the Royal Easter Show days) has hosted a range of exhibitions, social and commercial events and shows. Moore Park also houses Kippax Lake, an artificial lake named after William Kippax, an alderman of the 1860s and grandfather of the cricketer Alan Kippax, the ES Marks Athletics Field, the Moore Park Golf, the Parklands Sports Centre and a number of sports fields.

In October 2018 the Swans and the New South Wales Government announced an intention to upgrade the Pavilion and Hall of Industries. The Hall was to be equipped with indoor sporting and rehabilitation facilities and an international-standard netball court, providing permanent indoor training facilities for the Swans and professional netball club the New South Wales Swifts. The Hordern Pavilion would retain its live music scene and undergo a significant restoration to improve facilities for patrons and performers. The two precincts would also be joined closer together with barriers between them removed and cafes and other community facilities installed for use by the general public. The Swans train on the Tramway Oval (previously known as Lakeside Oval), located adjacent to the Sydney Cricket Ground, during the non-football season. The oval completed an extensive redevelopment in April 2019 and has identical dimensions to Docklands Stadium in Melbourne. In April 2020 the Swans pulled out of the agreement with the Government and Swifts, citing the financial implications of the COVID-19 pandemic. The agreement was renegotiated in August 2021, and will now be complete in late 2022.

Schools
Moore Park, served by the Department of Education, is the location of Sydney Boys High School, Sydney Girls High School (both of which are selective high schools).

Population 
At the 2021 census, the population of Moore Park was 18.

The  showed that Moore Park had a population of 28.

Gallery

References

External links

 
Suburbs of Sydney